Gadiculus, or the silvery pouts, are genus of cod, fishes in the family Gadidae. They are distributed in the coastal waters of the Northeast Atlantic and the adjacent Mediterranean Sea.

Species

Two species of Gadiculus are currently recognized:
Gadiculus argenteus, in the western Mediterranean and adjacent Atlantic waters
Gadiculus thori, from the Bay of Biscay north up to the North Cape.

References

Gadidae
Taxa named by Alphonse Guichenot